Amy Louise Edgar (born 27 December 1997) is an Australian cricketer who plays as a right-handed batter and right-arm medium pace bowler for Western Australia in the Women's National Cricket League (WNCL) and Perth Scorchers in the Women's Big Bash League (WBBL).

Edgar made her maiden WNCL half-century on 1 February 2019, scoring 67 in a 78-run loss to Tasmania. She spent part of the 2019–20 WBBL with the Perth Scorchers as a local replacement player but did not make an appearance. After a season away from the Scorchers, she made her debut for the side against Sydney Sixers in the 2021–22 WBBL

References

External links

Amy Edgar at Cricket Australia

1997 births
Living people
Place of birth missing (living people)
Australian women cricketers
Perth Scorchers (WBBL) cricketers
Western Australia women cricketers